Marco Weißhaupt (born 24 June 1972) is a German former professional footballer who played as an attacking midfielder.

External links
 

1972 births
Living people
Sportspeople from Erfurt
Association football midfielders
German footballers
East German footballers
FC Rot-Weiß Erfurt players
Hamburger SV players
1. FSV Mainz 05 players
SC Freiburg players
FC Hansa Rostock players
VfB Lübeck players
Sportfreunde Siegen players
Bundesliga players
2. Bundesliga players
Footballers from Thuringia
People from Bezirk Erfurt